Kirovsky is a rural locality (a village) in Ulu-Telyaksky Selsoviet, Iglinsky District, Bashkortostan, Russia. The population was 72 as of 2010. There are 5 streets.

Geography 
Kirovsky is located 56 km northeast of Iglino (the district's administrative centre) by road. Ulu-Telyak is the nearest rural locality.

References 

Rural localities in Iglinsky District